The Nodutdol for Korean Community Development or Nodutdol (Korean: 노둣돌, "stepping stone") is the largest progressive non-profit and non-governmental organization of Koreans residing in New York, but it also has a presence in different cities.

History 
Nodutdol was founded in April 1999 by Korean-American community organizer John Choe with a group of first- and second-generation Korean-American. It was inspired by anti-imperialist social movements in South Korea, and describes its mission as supporting reconciliation and friendship with the DPRK and an ultimate Korean unification. The organization has taken part of numerous protests in the United States. In turn, the organization has drawn criticism and opposition by some Korean-Americans for promulgating a sympathetic view of North Korea.

The group has organized 11 delegation to North Korea.

Activities 
The organization was part of the campaigns against the United States–Korea Free Trade Agreement, the State of Israel,  the sanctions against North Korea and for an official end of the Korean War. They have also participated in different types of protests with the United for Peace and Justice, Korean Americans for Fair Trade, Korean Americans for Peace, People’s Justice for Community Control and Police Accountability, International Action Center and A.N.S.W.E.R.

Beginning in 2012, the organization also ran the Intergenerational Korean American Oral History Project as a means to share knowledge about the Korean War and its impacts.

Notable members 

 Andrea Marra

See also 

 Korean American National Coordinating Council

References 

Korean-American society